The Mortagne is a  long river in the Vosges and Meurthe-et-Moselle départements, northeastern France. It flows generally northwest.

Communes along its course
This list is ordered from source to mouth: 
Vosges: Saint-Léonard, Taintrux, La Houssière, Bois-de-Champ, Les Rouges-Eaux, Mortagne, Domfaing, Brouvelieures, Fremifontaine, Autrey, Sainte-Hélène, Saint-Gorgon, Jeanménil, Rambervillers, Roville-aux-Chênes, Saint-Maurice-sur-Mortagne, Xaffévillers, Deinvillers
Meurthe-et-Moselle: Magnières, Vallois, Moyen, Gerbéviller, Haudonville, Lamath, Xermaménil, Mont-sur-Meurthe

References

Rivers of France
Rivers of Vosges (department)
Rivers of Meurthe-et-Moselle
Rivers of Grand Est